Coleophora amellivora is a moth of the family Coleophoridae. It is found from Fennoscandia to the Pyrenees, Italy and Romania and from France to Poland.

The larvae feed on Aster alpinus, Aster amellus, Aster linosyris and Aster salignus. They create a greyish brown tubular silken case with a mouth angle of 20-45°. The larva mines in the lower leaves. After the case has been tightened to the leaf, the larva leaves the case and makes a long corridor mine. Larvae can be found from September to May. After hibernation, the larvae do not feed.

References

amellivora
Moths described in 1979
Moths of Europe